North Carolina's 2nd House district is one of 120 districts in the North Carolina House of Representatives. It has been represented by Democrat Ray Jeffers since 2023.

Geography
Since 2023, the district has included all of Person County, as well as part of Durham County. The district overlaps with the 22nd and 23rd Senate districts.

District officeholders since 1993

Election results

2022

2020

2018

2016

2014

2012

2010

2008

2006

2004

2002

2000

References

North Carolina House districts
Person County, North Carolina
Durham County, North Carolina